The 6007th Reconnaissance Group is an inactive United States Air Force unit.  Its last was assigned to the 6007th Reconnaissance Wing, stationed at Yokota Air Base, Japan.  It was discontinued on 9 August 1957.

History
Performed highly classified missions over the Soviet Union and Communist China and reconnaissance monitoring of the Korean De-militarized Zone (DMZ) during the early years of the Cold War. In 1955, the unit was equipped with Martin RB-57A-1 Canberra aircraft.  The RB-57A-1s were RB-57A modified under Project Lightweight (later Project Heartthrob) with more powerful J65 engines, crew reduced from two to one, and all items not essential for the daytime photographic mission removed.

Inactivated in 1957, mission taken over by the 67th Tactical Reconnaissance Wing

Much of this unit's history remains classified as of 2012.

Lineage
 Designated as the 6007th Composite Reconnaissance Group, and organized on 11 August 1954
 Redesignated 6007th Reconnaissance Group (Composite) on 1 September 1954
 Discontinued on 9 August 1957

Assignments
 Far East Air Forces, 11 Aug 1954
 Fifth Air Force, 15 Oct 1954
 41st Air Division, 1 Mar 1955-9 Aug 1957.

Components
 6021st Photographic Mapping Flight (Tactical Reconnaissance), 1 December 1953 (Attached from Fifth Air Force)
 Redesignated: 6021st Reconnaissance Squadron, 1 March 1955-9 August 1957
 Attached to 67th Tactical Reconnaissance Wing: 1 July-9 August 1957
 6023d Radar Evaluation Flight, 18 March 1954 – 3 July 1956 (Attached from Fifth Air Force)
 6091st Reconnaissance Flight, 1 December 1953 (Attached from Fifth Air Force)
 Redesignated: 6091st Reconnaissance Squadron, 20 December 1954-9 August 1957
 Attached to 67th Tactical Reconnaissance Wing: 1 July-9 August 1957
 548th Reconnaissance Technical Squadron, 1 July 1955 – 9 August 1957 (attached to 67th Tactical Reconnaissance Wing after 1 July 1957)

Stations
 Yokota AB, Japan,  11 August 1954 – 9 August 1957

Aircraft

6091st Reconnaissance Squadron
 RB-29 Superfortress  (Photo-Recon), 1954
 RB-50B Superfortress (Photo/Weather Recon), 1954-1961
 RB-50E Superfortress (Photo-Recon), 1954-1961
 RB-50G Superfortress (ELINT/Radar Recon), 1954-1961
 RB-45C Tornado, 1954
 RB-57F Canberra, 1963-1968
 C-47 Skytrain, 1954-1968
 C-119G Flying Boxcar, 1954-1968
 C-130A-II Hercules, 1961-1968
 EC-97G Stratofreighter, 19631968

6021st Reconnaissance Squadron
 RF-86F Sabre (Haymaker), 1953-1956
 RF-80C Shooting Star, 1954-1955
 RT-33A Shooting Star, 1954-1957
 RB-57A-1 Canberra (Heartthrob), 1955-1957
 RF-84F Thunderstreak, 1956-1957
 RF-100A Super Sabre (Slick Chick), 1957-1957

6023d Radar Evaluation Flight
 ECM TB-29 Superfortress (Electronic Countermeasures), 1954-1956

See also

References

Notes

Bibliography

 

Further reading
 Brugioni, Dino A (2010), Eyes in the Sky: Eisenhower, the CIA and Cold War Aerial Espionage, Naval Institute Press, 

Military units and formations established in 1950
Four digit groups of the United States Air Force
Reconnaissance groups of the United States Air Force